The Edinburgh Sevens is played annually as part of the IRB Sevens World Series for international rugby sevens (seven-a-side version of rugby union). The 2009 competition, which took place on 30 May and 31 May in Edinburgh, Scotland, was the eighth and final Cup trophy in the 2008–09 IRB Sevens World Series.

On the first day of the competition, South Africa advanced to the quarterfinals of the Cup competition, thereby assuring them of the overall season title; they needed only to finish within the top nine teams to make it impossible for second-place England to catch them on the season log. South Africa went on advance to the Cup finals, where they were defeated 20–19 by Fiji, who passed England for second place on the season log in the process. Last year's series champions New Zealand won the second-level Plate competition, with England winning the Bowl and the USA winning the Shield.

Format
The tournament consists of four round-robin pools of four teams. All sixteen teams progress to the knockout stage. The top two teams from each group progress to quarter-finals in the main competition, with the winners of those quarter-finals competing in Cup semi-finals and the losers competing in Plate semi-finals. The bottom two teams from each group progress to quarter-finals in the consolation competition, with the winners of those quarter-finals competing in Bowl semi-finals and the losers competing in Shield semi-finals.

Teams

Pool stages

Pool A
{| class="wikitable" style="text-align: center;"
|-
!width="200"|Team
!width="40"|Pld
!width="40"|W
!width="40"|D
!width="40"|L
!width="40"|PF
!width="40"|PA
!width="40"|+/-
!width="40"|Pts
|- 
|align=left| 
|3||3||0||0||81||27||+54||9
|- 
|align=left| 
|3||2||0||1||63||24||+39||7
|- 
|align=left|  
|3||1||0||2||41||60||-19||5
|- 
|align=left| 
|3||0||0||3||15||89||-74||3
|}

Pool B
{| class="wikitable" style="text-align: center;"
|-
!width="200"|Team
!width="40"|Pld
!width="40"|W
!width="40"|D
!width="40"|L
!width="40"|PF
!width="40"|PA
!width="40"|+/-
!width="40"|Pts
|- 
|align=left| 
|3||3||0||0||107||26||+81||9
|- 
|align=left|  
|3||2||0||1||72||33||+39||7
|- 
|align=left| 
|3||1||0||2||40||80||-40||5
|- 
|align=left| 
|3||0||0||3||7||54||-90||3
|}

Pool C
{| class="wikitable" style="text-align: center;"
|-
!width="200"|Team
!width="40"|Pld
!width="40"|W
!width="40"|D
!width="40"|L
!width="40"|PF
!width="40"|PA
!width="40"|+/-
!width="40"|Pts
|- 
|align=left|  
|3||3||0||0||78||31||+47||9
|- 
|align=left|  
|3||2||0||1||66||44||+22||7
|- 
|align=left| 
|3||1||0||2||57||66||-9||5
|- 
|align=left| 
|3||0||0||3||17||87||-70||3
|}

Pool D
{| class="wikitable" style="text-align: center;"
|-
!width="200"|Team
!width="40"|Pld
!width="40"|W
!width="40"|D
!width="40"|L
!width="40"|PF
!width="40"|PA
!width="40"|+/-
!width="40"|Pts
|- 
|align=left| 
|3||3||0||0||101||28||+73||9
|- 
|align=left|  
|3||2||0||1||83||45||+38||7
|- 
|align=left| 
|3||1||0||2||78||61||+17||5
|- 
|align=left|  
|3||0||0||3||14||142||-128||3
|}

Knockout

Shield

Bowl

Plate

Cup

External links
 IRB Sevens
 London Sevens on irb.com

Edinburgh
Edinburgh Sevens
Edinburgh Sevens
Scotland Sevens